Dunlap is an English surname; notable people with this name include: 

 Adele Dunlap (1902–2017), American academic and nation's oldest living person
 Albert J. Dunlap (1937–2019), American businessman
 Benjamin B. Dunlap, American academic
 Carla Dunlap-Kaan (born 1954), American female bodybuilder
 Clarence Dunlap (1908–2003), Canadian air marshal
 David Dunlap (1910–1994), American rower (eights), gold medal winner at the 1932 Olympics
 David L. Dunlap (1877–1954), American athlete and coach
 David W. Dunlap, American author and journalist
 Dawn Dunlap (born 1963), American actress (Laura)
 Ericka Dunlap, Miss Florida and Miss America
 Fred Dunlap (1859–1902), American baseball player
 Harriet Ball Dunlap (1867-1957), American social reformer
 Henry M. Dunlap (1853-1938), American farmer and politician
 John Dunlap (1747–1812), American printer and patriot
 John R. Dunlap (1857–1937), American journalist, editor and publisher
 King Dunlap, American football player
 Robert H. Dunlap (1879–1931), United States Marine Corps general
 Robert P. Dunlap (1794–1859), governor of Maine 1834–1838
 Tori Dunlap, American investor, feminist, and social media personality
 Victoria Dunlap (born 1989), American basketball player
 William Dunlap (1766–1839), American playwright
 William R. Dunlap, American artist, arts commentator and educator

See also 
 Dunlop (surname)